Monster Rancher, known in Japan as , is a Japanese media franchise and series of life simulation role-playing video games created by Tecmo (now Koei Tecmo). The series consists of fifteen games across numerous different video game platforms, and an anime adaptation that aired from 1999 to 2000.

Monster Rancher is a popular series in Japan, and it maintains a cult following elsewhere. As of 2007, the series has sold 4 million copies.

Setting
Monster Rancher is set in a world where monsters exist alongside humans. Monsters were created by God in ancient times, following a disaster that struck the world prior to continental drift. However, the monsters caused problems for humanity, so God sealed them in "disc stones", small circular stone tablets containing their genomes, and entrusted humanity with them. However, as time passed, the disc stones became lost knowledge.

Eventually, archaeologists rediscovered a disc stone while excavating ancient ruins. They brought the disc stone to the Monsters' Temple, where the priests, using ancient summoning methods, summoned the monster in the disc stone back into existence. Monsters were reintroduced into nature and, for the most part, coexisted with humans. Eventually, monster owners and breeders began holding monster battles as a sport, which became popular worldwide, leading to official battle tournaments.

Games

Monster Rancher is often compared to Pokémon, though the two series play differently. While the Pokémon games are traditionally collection-based role-playing video games, Monster Rancher games tend to be simulated animal breeding games. The genre Monster Rancher occupies is shared by other simulation virtual pet games, such as Digimon, and games based on raising horses for racing, like in the Gallop Racer series, also by Tecmo.

In the games, the player takes the role of a monster breeder whose goal is to raise monsters to fight in tournaments. The breeder must raise the monster throughout its life, training it, keeping it healthy, making an exercise schedule, and trying to maximize its abilities before it dies of old age or is retired. Monsters have good or bad morale depending on how they are raised; loyal monsters are more likely to listen to commands, while disloyal monsters might refuse to obey commands or not fight at all. Famous monsters are more likely to land critical hits. Retired monsters can be combined to create more powerful monsters.

Monster generation
In Monster Rancher, Monster Rancher 2, Monster Rancher 3, Monster Rancher 4, and Monster Rancher EVO, monsters can be generated by inserting any CD into the game system. Monster Rancher 3, Monster Rancher 4, and Monster Rancher EVO can also use DVDs.

The characteristics of the monster (such as stats, breed and traits) are determined by various numbers stored in the game. To generate a monster, a random number generator is needed to define what characteristics the monster will have. Tecmo created a CD-reading system that would use the discs to generate random number seeds and, consequently, a large variety of random monsters. The values found in the discs' data are mapped to monster characteristics.

Some discs are designed to produce specific monsters, often thematically related to the disc in question. For instance, in Monster Rancher 4, the Harry Potter and the Chamber of Secrets DVD (as well as the tie-in PlayStation 2 game) generates a unique owl monster, and in Monster Rancher 2 and Monster Rancher 4, Tecmo's Dead or Alive game creates a Pixie named Kasumi. Special CDs, called "pandora discs", can produce multiple monsters. Often, the Monster Rancher game CD itself is a pandora disc.

Different generation methods 
In most modern Monster Rancher games, monster generation no longer uses discs, or at least make them less important, due to their waning popularity and production.

In Monster Rancher Advance and Monster Rancher Advance 2, the system generates random monsters by using character sequences rather than CDs, due to the limitations of the Game Boy Advance game cartridges. Certain combinations of characters will determine the monster's breed, sub-breed, stats, and traits. Codes found in-game can be used to generate rare monsters.

In Monster Rancher DS and Monster Rancher DS 2, the system is revised to take advantage of the Nintendo DS's input devices. Monsters can be generated by speaking into the microphone, drawing figures on the bottom screen, or inserting a Game Boy Advance game cartridge into the second slot.

In Monster Farm Online, players select a monster species they have some knowledge of, with the basic purebreeds automatically available, then insert a disc to create their traits. This is so that players do not need to find a disc that is unique to one particular territory to get the rarest monsters.

In Monster Rancher 1 & 2 DX, a modern remaster of Monster Rancher 1 and 2, the disc system from the original games is replaced with a digital database of CDs, DVDs, music, and video games. Instead of inserting a disc, the player enters a query for Title, Artist, or both, and chooses from a list of media, from which the monster assigned to the selected media will be generated. The monsters assigned to each media are the same across all copies; for example, selecting the album Trouble by Whitesnake always generates the "Swimmer" variant of the Mew monster, which can also be generated from other media.

In Ultra Kaiju Monster Rancher, an Ultraman-themed spinoff of the series, the generation system uses NFC devices (such as mobile phones, payment cards, and transit passes) alongside special codes, a keyword input menu, and the digital database from 1 & 2 DX.

Game releases

PlayStation
Monster Rancher
Monster Rancher 2
Monster Rancher: Hop-A-Bout
Monster Rancher Battle Card Episode II

Game Boy Color
Monster Rancher Battle Card GB
Monster Rancher Explorer

PlayStation 2
Monster Rancher 3
Monster Rancher 4
Monster Rancher EVO

Game Boy Advance
Monster Rancher Advance
Monster Rancher Advance 2

Nintendo DS
Kaite Shabette Hajimeyou!: Monster Farm DS (Japan only)
Monster Rancher DS (known as Monster Farm DS 2: Yomigaeru! Master Breeder Densetsu in Japan)

Nintendo Switch
Monster Rancher
Monster Rancher 2
Ultra Kaiju Monster Rancher

Microsoft Windows
Monster Farm Online (Japan only)
Monster Rancher
Monster Rancher 2

Android & iOS
My Monster Rancher
Monster Rancher 1 Million
Monster Farm POP (Japan only)
Monster Farm POP 2 (Japan only)
Monster Rancher
Monster Rancher 2

Anime

Monster Rancher is an anime series based on the Monster Rancher video games. A total of 73 episodes were produced over 2 series, which were split into 3 seasons for the English release, airing from 1999 to 2000. It originally aired in Japan on TBS, in the United States on Fox Kids and Fox Family Channel, in the United Kingdom on CBBC, and in Canada on YTV.

Reception

The Monster Rancher series has received overall positive reviews.

References

External links

Tecmo US

 
Video game franchises
Koei Tecmo franchises
Playmates Toys
Video game franchises introduced in 1997
Video games adapted into television shows